Stefanov (feminine Stefanova),, also Stefanoff, is a patronymic Slavic surname. Notable people with this surname include:
Antoaneta Stefanova, a Bulgarian chess grandmaster
Boris Stefanov, also known as Boris Ştefanov, a Romanian communist politician
Boris Stefanov (equestrian)
Georgi Stefanov
Gligor Stefanov, a sculptor and environmental installations artist who lives in Canada
Iliyan Stefanov
István Stefanov
Khristo Stefanov
Krasimir Stefanov
Ljubomir Stefanov
Metodiy Stefanov
Mladen Stefanov
Nikoleta Stefanova, a Bulgarian-born Italian table tennis player
Nadja Stefanoff (born 1983), a German soprano
Ognyan Stefanov
Petar Stefanov
Riste Stefanov, a Macedonian professional basketball player
Roman Stefanov
Stoyan Stefanov
Tanya Stefanova, a female pole vaulter from Bulgaria
Vrbica Stefanov, a former Yugoslav and Macedonian professional basketball player
Parik Stefanov, a Romanian chess international master.
Zhelyu Stefanov

See also
 Kotoōshū Katsunori, born as Kaloyan Stefanov Mahlyanov

Macedonian-language surnames
Bulgarian-language surnames
Patronymic surnames
Surnames from given names